Olha Vasylivna Bura (22 July 1986 – 10 March 2014) was a Ukrainian activist who took part in the Euromaidan protests in Kyiv from late 2013 to early 2014. Born to a poor family in Busk Raion, she did not have a permanent place to work due to illness, doing various jobs in the family home, working briefly at a local bakery as well as doing childcare. Busk died after contracting a blood infection from her hand being injured by members of the Berkut some days before consulting doctors. She was posthumously conferred the title of Hero of Ukraine with the Order of the Gold Star, a memorial plaque was installed on the primary school in  she attended was attended and a sign in the Alley of Memory of the Heroes of the Heavenly Hundred of Lviv Region in Khodoriv was named for her.

Biography
Bura had three siblings and was the daughter of Nadezhda. From her youth, she was unwell due to a weak kidney and was classified in the third group of disabilities. Bura was educated at Ripniv school from 1993 and then attended Novomylyatyn Secondary School of grades I-III until 2002.

Upon leaving secondary school, she was not required to go and find employment due to her being placed in the third group of disabilities. Bura helped out with jobs at home and briefly worked at a local bakery. She helped the local community to dig potatoes, collect beets and herding cows. Bura also worked as a nanny doing childcare. She did not acquire a permanent job during her lifetime. Bura was married twice (her first husband predeceased her) and did not have any children from both marriages.

She began taking part in the Euromaidan protests at Maidan Nezalezhnosti in Kyiv from 24 November 2013. Bura and her husband spent the following three months and helped the Sea Hundred" Maidan protesters starting from 1 December 2013, guarding and constructing barricades and also working in the kitchen and warehouse. She died in a hospital in Kyiv on 10 March 2014 after contracting a blood infection from her hand being injured by members of the Berkut some days before consulting doctors. On the morning of 13 March, Bura received a funeral service in Ripniv, and she was buried in the village on the same day.

Awards
President Petro Poroshenko conferred Bura the title of Hero of Ukraine  posthumously "For civic courage, patriotism, heroic defense of the constitutional foundations of democracy, human rights and freedoms, selfless service to the Ukrainian people, demonstrated during the Revolution of Dignity" in November 2014. A memorial plaque dedicated to her on facade of Ripniv Elementary School was unveiled in April 2016. The following month, Bura posthumously received the Certificate of the Supreme Archbishop of Kyiv-Halytskyi Svyatoslav of the Ukrainian Greek Catholic Church. Her name and portrait are engraved on the engraved on both the Kyiv and Lviv memorials of the Heroes of the Heavenly Hundred and a sign in the Alley of Memory of the Heroes of the Heavenly Hundred of Lviv Region in Khodoriv was named for her. Bura was also named an honorary citizen of Busk Raion.

References

1986 births
2014 deaths
People from Lviv Oblast
20th-century Ukrainian women
21st-century Ukrainian women
Ukrainian women activists
People of the Euromaidan
Recipients of the title of Hero of Ukraine
Recipients of the Order of Gold Star (Ukraine)